Angel Arroyo (born 2 September 1965) is a Puerto Rican weightlifter. He competed in the men's featherweight event at the 1988 Summer Olympics.

References

External links
 

1965 births
Living people
Puerto Rican male weightlifters
Olympic weightlifters of Puerto Rico
Weightlifters at the 1988 Summer Olympics
Place of birth missing (living people)
20th-century Puerto Rican people